Samur or SYHK (short for Seyyar Yüzücü Hücum Köprüsü) is a Turkish amphibious armoured vehicle-launched bridge. Samur is the Turkish word for sable.

The equipment was developed and produced for the Turkish Armed Forces (TSK) by the Turkish company FNSS Defence Systems. After six years of development work, four units were delivered on September 14, 2011, in Ankara. The SYHK will improve the capability of the Turkish Army during river crossing operations.

Characteristics

Basic systems
 Central tire inflation system (CTIS)
 Traction control system (TC)
 Recovery crane
 CBRN and ballistic protected personnel cabin
 Standard and emergency anchoring systems
 Radio and intercom 
 Controller area network bus CAN bus
 Integrated failure detection system
 Automatic bilge water pumping (manually if needed)

Vehicle specifications
 Power plant:  diesel engine
 Transmission: 6 speeds forward, 1 reverse (fully automatic)
 Number of axles: 4 (All-wheel drive)
 Suspension: Double wishbone independent air suspension
Electric power system:
 Battery: 2 x 12 V, 120 Ah (C20)
 Alternator: 2 x 140 A brushless
 Brake system: Hydraulic brake and anti-lock braking system (ABS) (all wheels)
 Parking pawl: Integrated into transmission, spring mechanic and hydraulic controlled
 Tires: 16.00 R20 solid disc (Run-flat tire type)
 Max. speed:
 Land: 
 Water:  by two pump-jets
 Operational range:  	
 Max. grade: 50%
 Max. grade (side slope): 30%
 Max. steep obstacle height: 
 Max. ditch width: 
 Min. turning radius: 
 Max. payload capacity:
 Double transport unit: MLC 70 (tracked vehicles)
 Triple transport unit: MLC 100 (wheeled vehicles)
 Deployed bridge mode: MLC 70 and MLC 100

General information
 Crew: 3	
 Weight: 
 Vehicle class: MLC 35
 Length: 
 Width: 
 Height: 
 Ground clearance:  (adjustable)

References

External links
 
 FNSS - SAMUR promotional video.

Armoured vehicle-launched bridges
Wheeled military vehicles
Amphibious military vehicles
Military recovery vehicles
Military engineering vehicles
Armoured fighting vehicles of Turkey
Post–Cold War military equipment of Turkey
Samur